The Sarajevo International Guitar Festival is an international multi-day classical guitar music festival which annually takes place in Sarajevo, Bosnia and Herzegovina. It was established in 2011 and is the only festival of its kind in Bosnia and Herzegovina. Since 2017 it is a full-member of EuroStrings. The festival has hosted numerous international names such as Margarita Escarpa, Rovshan Mamedkuliev, Sérgio Assad, Juanjo Domínguez, Le Trio Joubran, Roland Dyens, Dušan Bogdanović, Yorgos Foudoulis, Petar Čulić, Hubert Käppel, Pablo Márquez and others.

Format
The festival is composed of five competition and three non-competition programmes. The latter include evening concerts of established international classical guitarists and the YoungStars concert programme designed as a showcase for up and coming talents. Furthermore, the festival organises masterclasses and workshops held in the Sarajevo Music Academy and the Sarajevo National Theatre. An annual exhibition of spanish guitars is also held in the Bosniak Institute.

References

External links
Official Website

Tourist attractions in Sarajevo
Classical guitar
Festivals in Sarajevo
Guitar competitions
Music festivals in Bosnia and Herzegovina
Annual events in Bosnia and Herzegovina
2011 establishments in Bosnia and Herzegovina